In mathematics, and particularly in axiomatic set theory, ♣S (clubsuit) is a family of combinatorial principles that are a weaker version of the corresponding ◊S; it was introduced in 1975 by Adam Ostaszewski.

Definition
For a given cardinal number  and a stationary set ,  is the statement that there is a sequence  such that

 every Aδ is a cofinal subset of δ
 for every unbounded subset , there is a  so that 
 is usually written as just .

♣ and ◊
It is clear that ◊ ⇒ ♣, and it was shown in 1975  that ♣ + CH ⇒ ◊; however, Saharon Shelah gave a proof in 1980 that there exists a model of ♣ in which CH does not hold, so ♣ and ◊ are not equivalent (since ◊ ⇒ CH).

See also
Club set

References

Set theory
Mathematical principles